Semiquinone (or ubisemiquinone) is a free radical resulting from the removal of one hydrogen atom with its electron during the process of dehydrogenation of a hydroquinone, such as hydroquinone itself or catechol, to a quinone or alternatively the addition of a single H atom to a quinone. It is highly unstable.

It is the first of two stages in reducing the supplementary form of CoQ10 ubiquinone to the active form ubiquinol.

References

Light reactions